Carson is a gender-neutral given name. It comes from an Irish and Scottish surname, which is of unknown meaning.  It may refer to:

People with the given name Carson

A
Carson Allen, American singer-songwriter

B
Carson W. Beck (born 1962), American politician
Carson Bigbee (1895–1964), American baseball player
Carson Blair (born 1989), American baseball player
Carson Block (born 1977), American investor
Carson Boren (1824–1912), American pioneer
Carson Branstine (born 2000), Canadian-American tennis player
Carson Brewer (1920–2003), American journalist

C
Carson Chamberlain, American songwriter
Carson Charles, Trinidadian politician
Carson Cistulli (born 1979), American poet
Carson Clark (born 1989), American volleyball player
Carson Coffman (born 1988), American football player
Carson Cole (born 1965), Canadian singer
Carson Cooman (born 1982), American composer
Carson Cooper (1897–1955), Canadian ice hockey player
Carson Cunningham (born 1977), American basketball coach

D
Carson Dach (born 1980), American football player
Carson Daly (born 1973), American television host
Carson Davidson (1924–2016), American filmmaker

E
Carson Ebanks (born 1956), Caymanian sailor
Carson Ellis (born 1975), American illustrator

F
Carson Fagan (born 1982), Caymanian footballer
Carson Foster (born 2001), American swimmer
Carson Fox, American artist
Carson Fulmer (born 1993), American baseball player

G
Carson Grant (born 1950), American actor
Carson Gulley (1897–1962), American academic administrator

H
Carson Hocevar (born 2003), American stock car racing driver
Carson Huey-You (born 2002), American child prodigy

J
Carson D. Jeffries (1922–1995), American physicist
Carson Jones (born 1986), American boxer
Carson Jorgensen, American politician

K
Carson Kelly (born 1994), American baseball player
Carson Klein (born 2002), American soccer player
Carson Kreitzer, American playwright
Carson Kressley (born 1969), American fashion expert

L
Carson Lambos (born 2003), Canadian ice hockey player
Carson Long (born 1954), American football player

M
Carson MacCormac (born 1999), Canadian actor
Carson McCullers (1917–1967), American writer
Carson McHone, American singer-songwriter
Carson McMillan (born 1988), Canadian ice hockey player
Carson Meier (born 1995), American football player
Carson Meyer (born 1997), American ice hockey player
Carson Millar, Saint Lucian football manager
Carson Miller (cyclist) (born 1989), American cyclist
Carson K. Miller, American academic administrator
Carson Morrison (1902–1993), American professor

P
Carson Palmer (born 1979), American football player
Carson Palmquist (born 2000), American baseball player
Carson Parks (1936–2005), American songwriter
Carson Pickett (born 1993), American soccer player
Carson Porter, American soccer coach

R
Carson Abel Roberts (1905–1983), American lieutenant general
Carson Robison (1890–1957), American singer-songwriter
Carson Rockhill (born 1990), Canadian American football player
Carson Ross (born 1946), American politician

S
Carson Smith (disambiguation), multiple people
Carson Soucy (born 1994), Canadian ice hockey player
Carson Steele (born 2002), American football player
Carson Strong (born 1999), American football player

T
Carson Talboys (born 1999), American soccer player
Carson Tinker (born 1989), American football player

V
Carson Van Osten (1945–2015), American musician
Carson Vitale (born 1988), Canadian baseball coach
Carson Vom Steeg (born 1999), American soccer player

W
Carson Walch (born 1978), American football coach
Carson Ware (born 2000), American stock car racing driver
Carson Fordham Wells Jr. (1880–1956), American architect
Carson Wen (born 1953), Hong Kong businessman
Carson Wentz (born 1992), American football player
Carson Whisenhunt (born 2000), American baseball player
Carson Whitsett (1945–2007), American keyboardist
Carson Wiggs (born 1990), American football player
Carson Williams (electrical engineer), American electrical engineer
Carson Williams (baseball) (born 2003), American baseball player

Y
Carson Yeung (born 1960), Hong Kong businessman

See also
Carson (disambiguation), a disambiguation page for Carson
Carson (surname), people with the surname Carson

References

English masculine given names
Scottish masculine given names
Irish masculine given names